Second Apocalypse can refer to:

The Second Apocalypse, a series of fantasy novels by R. Scott Bakker.
The Second Apocalypse of James, one of the Gnostic Gospels, part of the New Testament apocrypha.